Royal Order of the Crown of Hawaii is an order founded in 1882 by king Kalākaua to commemorate his ascension to the throne.

The order is bestowed upon people for loyalty and meritorious service for the crown of Hawaii or for merits on the field of culture and education. The order was dormant for a long while but was re-established in 2016.

The order is awarded in seven different classes: 

  Grand Cross
  Grand Officer
  Commander
  Officer
  Companion
  Gold medal
  Silver medal

References 

Hawaiian Kingdom
Orders, decorations, and medals of Hawaii
Awards established in 1882